The Wiechel projection is an azimuthal, equal-area map projection, and a novelty map presented by William H. Wiechel in 1879. It is also a modified azimuthal projection. Distortion of direction, shape, and distance is considerable in the edges.

In polar aspect, the Wiechel projection can be expressed as so:

See also
 Lambert azimuthal equal-area projection

References

Map projections
Equal-area projections